Agyneta uta is a species of sheet weaver found in the United States. It was described by Chamberlin in 1920.

References

uta
Spiders of the United States
Spiders described in 1920